Cat's pajamas may refer to:
The Cat's Pajamas: Stories, a 2004 a collection of short stories by Ray Bradbury
The Cat's Pajamas, a children's book by Thacher Hurd
"The Cat's Pyjamas", a song by Isobel Campbell on Amorino (album)
The Cat's Pyjamas, a 1992 book by Norman Thelwell
The Cat's Pajamas, a 2004 book by James Morrow
The Cat's Pajamas, a 1926 American comedy silent film directed by William A. Wellman